The Palais Rohan is the name of the Hôtel de Ville, or City Hall, of Bordeaux, France. The building was constructed from 1771 to 1784, originally serving as the Archbishop's Palace of Bordeaux.

History 

In 1771, the new Archbishop of Bordeaux, Ferdinand Maximilien Mériadec, prince of Rohan, decided to rebuild the old medieval archbishop's residence, viewing it as not being worthy of its rank. The new building was designed by the architect Richard-François Bonfin, it took 13 years to build and was completed in 1784. It is a hôtel particulier, "entre cour et jardin" (placed "between a courtyard and a garden"), and features an austere Louis XVI-style façade. Its staircase is considered a masterpiece of stone masonry.

After the French Revolution, in 1791, the building housed the Gironde department prefecture. In 1837 it became the Bordeaux Town Hall. The municipal council room, designed in 1889, is characteristic of official architecture during the Third Republic.

The garden, initially designed in the French formal style, now takes on an English landscape style. Since 1880, it has been bordered by two wings that house the Musée des Beaux-Arts de Bordeaux.

References

External links
 The Palais Rohan, quarter of Hôtel de Ville - Bordeaux Tourism

Buildings and structures in Bordeaux
Rohan
City and town halls in France
Houses completed in 1784
Museums in Bordeaux